

This is a detailed table of the district on the National Register of Historic Places in DeSoto County, Florida, United States. The location of the National Register district for which the latitude and longitude coordinates are included below, may be seen in a map.

There are 5 listings on the National Register in the county.

Current listing

|}

See also

 List of National Historic Landmarks in Florida
 National Register of Historic Places listings in Florida

References

 
DeSoto County